Duck is the surname of:

Andrew J. Duck, United States Democratic politician
Arthur Duck (1580–1648), English lawyer and Member of Parliament
Emma Duck (born 1981), British sprinter and hurdler
Jacob Duck (1600–1667), Dutch painter and etcher
Jenny Duck (born 1968), former field hockey player from New Zealand
Nicholas Duck (1570–1628), English lawyer
Olive Duck (1912–1925), Australian female murder victim
Richard Duck, English early 16th-century Vice-Chancellor of Oxford University
Simeon Duck (1834–1905), British Columbia businessman and politician
Stephen Duck (c. 1705–1756), English poet

See also
Ducke
Duckie (disambiguation)
Ducky (disambiguation)